Coral Keys is an album led by pianist Walter Bishop Jr. which was recorded in 1971 and originally released on the Black Jazz label.

Track listing 
All compositions by Walter Bishop Jr.
 "Coral Keys" – 5:44
 "Waltz for Zweetie" – 5:22
 "Track Down" – 6:30
 "Soul Turn Around" – 5:31
 "Our November" – 5:15
 "Three Loves" – 4:44
 "Freedom Suite" – 9:33

Personnel 
Walter Bishop Jr. – piano
Woody Shaw – trumpet (tracks 5–7) 
Harold Vick – flute, soprano saxophone, tenor saxophone
Reggie Johnson – bass
Alan Shwaetz Benger (tracks 5–7), Idris Muhammad (tracks 1–4) – drums

References 

Walter Bishop Jr. albums
1971 albums
Black Jazz Records albums